Enkhtaivany Davaakhüü (born 12 June 1989) is a Mongolian sports shooter. He competed in the men's 10 metre air pistol event at the 2020 Summer Olympics.

References

External links
 

1989 births
Living people
Mongolian male sport shooters
Olympic shooters of Mongolia
Shooters at the 2020 Summer Olympics
Shooters at the 2010 Asian Games
Shooters at the 2014 Asian Games
Shooters at the 2018 Asian Games
Universiade gold medalists for Mongolia
Medalists at the 2015 Summer Universiade
Universiade medalists in shooting
Sportspeople from Ulaanbaatar
21st-century Mongolian people